Het Jaar van de Kreeft  (The Year of the Cancer) is a 1975 Dutch film directed by Herbert Curiel.

Cast
 Willeke van Ammelrooy as Toni
 Rutger Hauer as Pierre
 Piet Romer as Daan
 Sascha Hoffs as Muisje
 Bart Hammink as Karel
 Jennifer Willems as Pietje

Story
A movie about a short but intense relationship between a man (Rutger Hauer) and a woman (Willeke van Ammelrooy). The two are very different. She doesn't want to give up her independence. Also titled "Cancer Rising".

External links 
 

Dutch romantic drama films
1975 films
1970s Dutch-language films